Beiliu is a town in eastern Yangcheng County in western Jincheng Prefecture in southern Shanxi Province in central China. It administers the countryside including Phoenix Hill and the House of the Huangcheng Chancellor, a AAAAA-rated tourist attraction.

Administrative divisions

See also
 Other Beilius

Township-level divisions of Shanxi